Mohammad Raffi bin Nagoorgani (born 17 June 1994) is a Malaysian footballer who plays as a centre-back for Malaysia Super League club Kedah Darul Aman.

Career
Raffi began his football career with  Perak youth team before been promoted to first team squad and made his debut for the club in 2014.

In 2017, he signed a contract with PKNP on loan deal.
 On following year, Raffi made the move to the club permanently for the 2018 season.

Raffi has been called to the Malaysia national under-23 in 2015.

Career statistics

Club

Personal life
Raffi was married in January 2018.

Honours
Penang
 Malaysia Premier League: 2020

References

External links 
 

Living people
1994 births
Malaysian footballers
Association football defenders
PKNP FC players
Perak F.C. players
Penang F.C. players
Felda United F.C. players
Petaling Jaya City FC players
Malaysia Super League players